Hartmut Büttner is a German politician of the Christian Democratic Union (CDU) and former member of the German Bundestag.

Life 
In 1969 Büttner joined the Junge Union and in 1971 the CDU. From 1980 to 1983 he was state chairman of the Junge Union of Lower Saxony.  Büttner was a member of the German Bundestag for four terms from 20 December 1990. He twice won a direct mandate in his constituency (1990 and 1994) and was twice elected to parliament on the state list of Saxony-Anhalt (1998 and 2002).

References 

1952 births
Living people
Members of the Bundestag for Saxony-Anhalt
Members of the Bundestag 2002–2005
Members of the Bundestag 1998–2002
Members of the Bundestag 1994–1998
Members of the Bundestag 1990–1994
Members of the Bundestag for the Christian Democratic Union of Germany
People from Hanover Region